Wuping is a town of Fengdu County, Chongqing, China. , it has 2 residential communities and 8 villages under its administration.

References

Township-level divisions of Chongqing
Fengdu County